Kalanidhi Veeraswamy is an Indian politician. He was elected to the Lok Sabha, the lower house of the Parliament of India from Chennai North, Tamil Nadu in the 2019 Indian general election as member of the Dravida Munnetra Kazhagam. He is the son of Arcot N. Veeraswami, a former minister for electricity and health in the Indian state of Tamil Nadu. He is a medical doctor (a plastic surgeon) by profession.

References

External links
Official biographical sketch in Parliament of India website

India MPs 2019–present
Lok Sabha members from Tamil Nadu
Living people
Dravida Munnetra Kazhagam politicians
1969 births
People from Chennai
Tamil Nadu politicians